Liberty High School may refer to the following schools in the United States:

Arizona
Liberty High School (Globe, Arizona)
Liberty High School (Peoria, Arizona)

California
Liberty High School (Bakersfield, California)
Liberty High School (Benicia, California), Benicia, California
Liberty High School (Brentwood, California)
Liberty High School (Madera Ranchos, California); see California HeatWave

Colorado
Liberty High School (Colorado), in Colorado Springs

Florida
Liberty High School (Kissimmee, Florida)
Liberty High School (Palm Bay, Florida), a high school in Florida

Georgia
 Liberty County High School (Georgia) in Hinesville, Georgia

Illinois
Liberty High School (Illinois), in Liberty

Iowa
Liberty High School (Iowa), in North Liberty

Louisiana
Liberty High School (Baton Rouge, Louisiana)

Maryland
Liberty High School (Maryland), in Carroll County

Missouri
Liberty High School (Liberty, Missouri)
Liberty North High School, Liberty, Missouri
Liberty High School (Lake St. Louis, Missouri)

Nevada
Liberty High School (Nevada), in Henderson

New Jersey
Liberty High School (New Jersey), in Jersey City

New York
Liberty High School (Liberty, New York)
Liberty High School Academy for Newcomers, a high school in New York City

Ohio
Liberty Union High School, Baltimore
Liberty-Benton High School, Findlay
Olentangy Liberty High School, Powell
Liberty High School, Youngstown

Oregon
Liberty High School (Oregon)

Pennsylvania
Liberty High School (Bethlehem, Pennsylvania)
North Penn-Liberty High School, in Liberty

South Carolina
Liberty High School (South Carolina), a high school in South Carolina

Texas
Liberty High School (Frisco, Texas), Dallas/Fort Worth area
Liberty High School (Houston, Texas)
Liberty High School (Liberty, Texas), Liberty Independent School District, Houston metropolitan area

Virginia
Liberty High School (Bealeton, Virginia)
Liberty High School (Bedford, Virginia)
 The high school at Liberty Christian Academy in Lynchburg

Washington
Liberty High School (Washington), in Issaquah

West Virginia
Liberty High School (Clarksburg, West Virginia)
Liberty High School (Glen Daniel, West Virginia)

See also
Liberty Colored High School, Liberty, South Carolina
Liberty County High School (Georgia)
Liberty County High School (Florida)
Liberty High School (disambiguation)
Liberty School (disambiguation)